Diego Alessi (born 3 November 1971 in Rome) is an Italian race car driver. He competed in the Italian Touring Car Championship from 1996–1999 and 2001–2002 - obtaining 12 poles and 12 wins - then moved to the Trofeo Maserati Europe - with 19 poles and 3 wins between 2003 and 2006 - as well as making 3 starts in FIA GT for Autorlando Porsche. From 2006 to 2010 Diego Alessi competed in FIA GT3 Championship at the wheel of Maserati Grand Sport, Aston Martin DBRS9, Corvette Z06 and Ferrari 430 Scuderia, obtaining 1 pole, 2 wins and the 3 rd final overall place on 2007 championship.

In 2008, Diego participated in the Rolex Sports Car Series, driving a Pontiac GTO.R with young Californian Ryan Phinny, for Matt Connolly Motorsports P1 Groupe.  Team drove in the 24 Hours of Daytona with Hal Prewitt, Karl Reindler, Vic Rice and Spencer Trenery. On this season Alessi gets three podium finish (Mid-Ohio, Montreal and New Jersey).

From 2011 to 2015 Diego Alessi contest the ADAC GT Masters Series on the Callaway Corvette Z06, gaining 5 poles, 8 wins, one 2 nd final championship place (2012) and the overall Championship 2013 win.

During his career, Alessi also drove some of majors world endurance races - four Spa-Francorchamps 24 hours, three Daytona 24 hours, two Interlagos Thousandmiles, two 24 Hours of Sicily and one Dubai 24 hours - getting four podium finish globally.

External links
 

1971 births
Living people
Racing drivers from Rome
Italian racing drivers
Rolex Sports Car Series drivers
24 Hours of Daytona drivers
Superstars Series drivers
FIA GT Championship drivers
Blancpain Endurance Series drivers
ADAC GT Masters drivers
24 Hours of Spa drivers

European Le Mans Series drivers
Aston Martin Racing drivers